George Island Landing is an unincorporated community in Worcester County, Maryland, United States. George Island Landing is located at the eastern end of Maryland Route 366 on Chincoteague Bay.

References

Unincorporated communities in Worcester County, Maryland
Unincorporated communities in Maryland
Populated coastal places in Maryland